Statistics of Japanese Regional Leagues for the 1977 season.

Champions list

League standings

Tohoku

Kanto

Hokushinetsu

Tokai

Kansai

Chūgoku

Shikoku

Kyushu

1977
Jap
Jap
3